Business rates is the commonly used name of Non-Domestic Rates in Wales, a tax on occupation of non-domestic property. Rates are a property tax used to fund local services that date back to ancient times.

History 
Business rates in Wales have ancient roots, and were only formalised by the Vagabonds Act 1572 which modernized the system under the Tudor Poor Laws. The system was further reformed by the Act for the Relief of the Poor 1601.

The 1601 Act was repealed in 1967, and replaced by the predecessor to business rates, the General Rate Act 1967. This was subsequently reformed in the Local Government Finance Act 1988. That act established business rates in England and Wales from 1990.

In 1989, domestic properties were removed from the rating system with the introduction of the Poll Tax, later to be replaced with Council Tax.

Welsh Government control

In 2015, powers to adjust business rates were devolved to the Welsh Government. The rates provide an income of approximately £1bn in Wales.

Scope 
The Local Government Finance Act 1988 introduced a new system of business rates in England and Wales from 1990, further amended by the Local Government Finance Act 1992.

See also 

 Taxation in Wales
 Local income tax
 Taxation in the United Kingdom
 Rates
 Local government in the United Kingdom:Funding

References

External links 

 Valuation Office Agency

Taxation in Wales
Local government in Wales
Property taxes
Wales
Wales
Rates